Pankin is a Russian masculine surname, its feminine counterpart is Pankina. It may refer to:

Aleksandra Pankina (born 1972), Belarusian rower
Boris Pankin (born 1931), former Soviet Minister of Foreign Affairs 
Irina Pankina (born 1986), Russian politician
Ivanna S. Pankin (born Denise Grimes in 1969), American roller derby skater and organizer
Natalia Pankina, Russian long-distance swimmer
Nikolai Pankin (1949–2018) a former Soviet Olympic swimmer
Stuart Pankin (born 1946) an American film and television actor.

Russian-language surnames